Desh Bhagat University also popularly known as DBU is a private university located in Fatehgarh  Sahib district in Punjab.

Introduction
Desh Bhagat University (DBU) was established under Punjab Governments’ Desh Bhagat University Act, 2012. DBU has four campuses in India at Fatehgarh Sahib, Shri Muktsar Sahib, Moga and Chandigarh and an international campus in Kenya. It offers more than 350 courses in almost 50 various streams at undergraduate, graduate, post-graduate and doctorate level.
Desh Bhagat University came into existence under the guidance of Lal Singh, a freedom fighter.
Desh Bhagat Group of Institutes emerged in the guise of Desh Bhagat University in 1996, having different university schools imparting education in professional, academic and technical streams.

History
Desh Bhagat University came into existence under the guidance of S. Lal Singh, a freedom fighter and an associate member of INA whose name is Azad Hind Fauj of Neta Ji Subash Chander Bose (Father of Dr. Zora Singh, Chancellor of Desh Bhagat University). In 1972, the government of India awarded him the "Tamra Patra" for his efforts and services. In a short period of time, Desh Bhagat University grew into a well-known and large university. At present, Dr. Zora Singh is the Chancellor of the university. The efforts of Dr. Zora Singh are worth mentioning after the foundation of the university and nurturing it to its present state. The Desh Bhagat Group of Institutes emerged in the guise of Desh Bhagat University in 1996, having different university schools imparting education in professional, academic, and technical streams.

Affiliations
Desh Bhagat University is affiliated with the University Grants Commission (UGC) and the Indian Nursing Council (INC). Desh Bhagat University is also affiliated with the Pharmacy Council of India (PCI), the All India Council for Technical Education (AICTE) . Desh Bhagat University‘s law programmes of LLB, B.A, LLB and LLM are affiliated with the Bar Council of India (BCI). Desh Bhagat University is also accredited by NAAC.

Academic
Desh Bhagat University (DBU) has faculties like Arts, Science, Commerce,., Art & Craft, Fashion Technology, Agricultural Science, Journalism, Fine Arts, and nearly 50 streams and over 350 courses at the undergraduate, graduate, postgraduate, and doctorate levels are available.
DBU offers various diploma and certificate courses.
DBU  also offers M.Phil. and Ph.D degrees in 44 subjects .

Scholarships 
Desh Bhagat University offers various scholarships to meritorious and poor students  on basis of performance in academic ,cultural & co-curricular activities and sports . DBU also offers scholarships for children, grandchildren of descendents of freedom fighters. 
Desh Bhagat Univaersity “Shakti “ Scholarship
Desh BhagaT University “Sh . Lal Singh” Scholarship
Desh Bhagat University “Performer” Scholarship 
Desh Bhagat University “Swift “ Scholarship
Desh Bhagat University “Power” Scholarship

Campus
Desh Bhagat University is situated in Fatehgarh Sahib, Punjab. DBU has a large area that covers a huge area of land.
It offers beautiful flora and fauna with a state-of-the-art structure. Fully Wi-Fi campus, Research Centers, AC classrooms with the latest teaching aids, digitally equipped labs, and a well-stocked library with books, journals, printed materials, and an online browsing facility. There are separate hostels for boys and girls with modern amenities for comfortable living. DBU has its own transport facility. DBU has large seminar halls, auditoriums, and conference halls for all types of official and cultural occasions. DBU also has large playgrounds for the students to play different games, a multi-cuisine cafeteria, and a mini supermarket for  basic needs.

References

https://deshbhagatuniversity.in/
https://www.facebook.com/deshbhagatuniversitypunjab
https://www.instagram.com/deshbhagatuniversity/
http://youtube.com/channel/UCHsjcRKbHLst4IwJElQ4pYg?c=UCHsjcRKbHLst4IwJElQ4pYg

Universities in Punjab, India
Fatehgarh Sahib district
1972 establishments in Punjab, India
Educational institutions established in 1972